Albert Barakeina (born 1948) is a former Papua New Guinea international lawn bowler.

Bowls career
Barakeina has represented Papua New Guinea at the Commonwealth Games, in the pairs at the 1998 Commonwealth Games.

He won a bronze medal with Martin Seeto in the pairs, at the 1995 Asia Pacific Bowls Championships, in Dunedin.

References

1948 births
Living people
Bowls players at the 1998 Commonwealth Games
Papua New Guinean male bowls players